Jurij Rodionov was the defending champion but chose not to defend his title.

Jay Clarke won the title after defeating Adrián Menéndez Maceiras 6–1, 4–6, 7–6(7–5) in the final.

Seeds

Draw

Finals

Top half

Bottom half

References

External links
Main draw
Qualifying draw

Morelos Open - 1
2022 Singles